The discography of Darin, a Swedish pop singer, consists of eight studio albums, two live albums and 40 official singles.

Albums

Studio albums

Live albums

EPs

Compilation albums

Singles

Other charted songs

References

Discographies of Swedish artists
Pop music discographies